The 2019 Alabama State Hornets football team represented Alabama State University as a member of the East Division of the Southwestern Athletic Conference (SWAC) during 2019 NCAA Division I FCS football season. Led by second-year head coach Donald Hill-Eley, the Hornets compiled an overall record of 5–6 with a mark of 4–3 in conference play, tying for second place in the SWAC East Division. Alabama State played home games at New ASU Stadium in Montgomery, Alabama.

Previous season

The Hornets finished the 2018 season 4–7, 3–4 in SWAC play to finish in fourth place in the East Division.

Preseason

Preseason polls
The SWAC released their preseason poll on July 16, 2019. The Hornets were picked to finish in fourth place in the East Division.

Preseason all–SWAC teams
The Hornets placed five players on the preseason all–SWAC teams.

Defense

1st team

Christian Clark – DL

Darron Johnson – LB

2nd team

Joshua Hill – DB

Specialists

1st team

Anthony Craven – P

Ezra Gray – RS

Schedule

Game summaries

at UAB

Tuskegee

Kennesaw State

Grambling State

Alcorn State

at Jackson State

vs. Alabama A&M

at Mississippi Valley State

at Texas Southern

at Florida State

Prairie View A&M

References

Alabama State
Alabama State Hornets football seasons
Alabama State Hornets football